Tick-borne lymphadenopathy is a condition characterized by lymphadenopathy and a rash.

See also 
 Epidemic typhus
 Brill–Zinsser disease
 Rickettsia aeschlimannii infection
 List of cutaneous conditions

References 

Bacterium-related cutaneous conditions